The Nations team event competition at the FIS Alpine World Ski Championships 2021 was held on 17 February 2021.

FIS Overall Nations Cup standings
The participating nations were seeded according to the overall nations cup standings prior to the World Championships.

Teams marked in green participate.

Bracket

References

Nations team event